The Château de Fougères-sur-Bièvre is a castle in the commune of Fougères-sur-Bièvre, in the French department of Loir-et-Cher.

Originally an 11th-century structure, it was entirely rebuilt at the end of the 15th century, with only the large, square keep remaining original. The initial reconstruction retained the defensive aspect of the castle: moat, cannon-holes, parapet walk, etc. During the next century, Renaissance refinements, such as a gallery, mullioned windows and steep-sloped roofs were added. During the 19th century, a spinning mill was installed in the chapel. The castle was purchased and restored by the state in the 1930s.

It has been listed since 1912 as an historic site (monument historique) by the French Ministry of Culture.

See also

List of castles in France

References

 This article includes information from the French Wikipedia article Fougères-sur-Bièvre, specifically from this version.

External links
 Château de Fougères-sur-Bièvre, Centre des Monuments Nationaux
 
 Château de Fougères-sur-Bièvre, Google Arts & Culture

Castles in Centre-Val de Loire
Monuments historiques of Centre-Val de Loire
Historic house museums in Centre-Val de Loire
Museums in Loir-et-Cher
Monuments of the Centre des monuments nationaux